The Line Handling Work Boat-program , also known as the LHWB-program, was announced on 21 November 2022 by the Royal Netherlands Navy. As primary task they will have the moving of large fenders and help dock larger ships at the Nieuwe Haven Naval Base by moving lines. They will be built by Stormer Marine in Hoorn. First delivery is planned for 2023 and the last should be delivered by 2024.

See also 
 Future of the Royal Netherlands Navy

References 

Royal Netherlands Navy
Tugboats of the Royal Netherlands Navy
Proposed ships of the Royal Netherlands Navy